Arturo Ríos is a Mexican actor.

Career
Rios is largely a theatrical actor, but has also starred in films and on television.

He won the Ariel Award for Best Actor for his performance in the movie Fairy Tales for Sleeping Crocodiles, taking another Best Actor nomination for Desiertos mares.

In theater he has participated in more than 80 works and has won two awards as best actor: one for El otra exilo and the other for Devastated. He has been an actor of the National Theater Company and the Theater Experimentation Center (INBA). He was the founder of the Taller del Sótano theater group and is part of Por Piedad Teatro. He has also worked with Shadow Line Theater and Arena Theater. He has been a FONCA Fellow twice, first for playing Richard II in the Shakespeare play, and second as a Scenic Creator with Outstanding Career for the works "The Lesson" by Ionesco, "Shakespeare: his Invention" by Arturo Ríos, and "The Golden Dragon", by Roland Schimmelpfennig.

Filmography

Telenovelas 
 Educando a Nina (2018) as José Peralta
 La candidata (2017) as Fernando Escalante
 El alma herida (2003-2004) as Marcial
 Gitanas (2004) as Drago
 El sexo débil (2011) as Agustín Camacho

Television 
 El vuelo del águila (1994) as Ignacio de la Torre y Mier
 Al norte del corazón (1997)
 Yacaranday (1998) as Omar
 Tentaciones (1998) as Javier
 Cuentos para solitarios (1999)
 The House of Flowers (2018) as Ernesto De La Mora

Films
Ríos has starred in films including:

 Fantoche (1977) as Félix
 Sólo con Tu Pareja (1991) as Singer in nightmare sequence
 Desiertos mares (1995) as Juan Aguirre
 Between Pancho Villa and a Naked Woman  (1996) as Adrián.
 De ida y vuelta (2000)
Y Tu Mamá También as Esteban Morelos
 Cuentos de hadas para dormir cocodrilos (2002) as Archangel and Archangel Miguel
 Ópera (2007) as Pablo
 Cementerio de papel (2007) as Hugo
 Insignificant Things (2008) as Tomás
 Eddie Reynolds and the Steel Angels (2015) as Santos
 Apapacho: una caricia al alma (2018) as George

Theatre 
His latest roles include:
 Old Times
 The End, a monologue by Samuel Beckett
 Hamlet

References

External links 
 

Best Actor Ariel Award winners
Mexican male film actors
Mexican male television actors
Living people
Year of birth missing (living people)